Kenneth Overton Bernich (born September 6, 1951) is a former professional American football linebacker in the National Football League. He graduated from Archbishop Shaw High School in Marrero, Louisiana, and then Auburn University in 1974. Bernich was drafted by the San Diego Chargers in the 4th round (101st overall pick) of the 1975 NFL Draft. He played for the New York Jets in 1975.

After playing pro football, he is now an active high school football coach and is a member of the All-Sports Association in Fort Walton Beach, Florida.

Sources
 Kenneth Overton Bernich at databasefootball.com
nfl.com profile

1951 births
Living people
Sportspeople from Biloxi, Mississippi
All-American college football players
Players of American football from Mississippi
American football linebackers
Auburn Tigers football players
New York Jets players